Polhemus may refer to:

Gianni Polhemus, American road bike racer
Gretchen Polhemus (born 1965), former Miss USA and second runner-up to Miss Universe 1989
John T. Polhemus (1929–2013), American entomologist
Mark Polhemus (1860–1923), Major League Baseball player
Ted Polhemus (born 1947), American anthropologist, writer, and photographer who lives and works on England's south coast

See also
James S. Polhemus House, house in southeast Portland, Oregon listed on the National Register of Historic Places
Polhemus & Coffin, New York-based architectural firm formed by Henry M. Polhemus and Lewis Augustus Coffin
Polhemus Memorial Clinic in Brooklyn, New York, built in 1897 as an extension of a hospital for the poor